The 2017–18 season was the 58th season in the history of Nogometni klub Maribor. It began on 1 June 2017 and concluded on 31 May 2018, with competitive matches played between July and May. It was the first season since 2007–08 in which Maribor did not win a single trophy during the season as the team lost the league title to Olimpija Ljubljana due to worse head-to-head record after finishing with the same number of points (80) in 36 rounds. Olimpija also eliminated Maribor in the quarter-finals of the Slovenian Cup. However, Maribor fared better in European competitions as the team reached the group stages of the UEFA Champions League for the third time in club's history.

32 different players represented the club in three competitions and there were 17 different goalscorers. Maribor's top goalscorer was Marcos Tavares, who scored 22 goals in 47 games.

Transfers
In June 2017, Maribor signed Jean-Claude Billong and Jasmin Mešanović, both on a free transfer. Mešanović signed from Bosnian team Zrinjski Mostar, who were Maribor's opponents in the second qualifying round of the UEFA Champions League. Dejan Vokić, Martin Kramarič and Sunny Omoregie returned to squad after their loan spells ended. On 6 August 2017, Maribor signed Martin Milec, who already played for the club between 2010 and 2014. Dare Vršič, who was selected as the best player of the 2016–17 Slovenian PrvaLiga season, has re-signed with Maribor on 29 August 2017 after his previous contract with the club ran out after the 2016–17 season. On the same day, Maribor signed forward Adnan Ahmetović, who was the top goalscorer of the 2016–17 Slovenian U19 League. On the last day of the summer transfer window, Maribor acquired Israeli player Lior Inbrum on a season-long loan from Gent. In December 2017, Maribor announced a two new signings, a Malian defender Kassim Doumbia from FH and a Bosnian goalkeeper Kenan Pirić from Zrinjski. However, Maribor and Zrinjski reached an agreement that Pirić would stay at Zrinjski until the end of the season before joining Maribor in July 2018. On 12 January 2018, Maribor signed a Serbian defender Saša Ivković from Voždovac until 2021 for an undisclosed transfer fee. On 25 January 2018, Maribor acquired the Slovenian under-21 international forward Jan Mlakar from Fiorentina on a free transfer. On 13 February 2018, Maribor signed a three-and-a-half-year contract with Romanian defensive midfielder Alexandru Crețu, who previously played for Maribor's "eternal rivals" Olimpija Ljubljana.

Milivoje Novaković, who scored twelve goals in all competitions during the previous season, has retired. Defender Rodrigo Defendi and midfielder Sintayehu Sallalich have left the club after their contract ran out. On 1 August 2017, Žan Celar transferred to the Italian side Roma for a transfer fee of about €1 million. In December 2017, Jean-Claude Billong moved to the Serie A team Benevento for an undisclosed transfer fee, believed to be around €2 million. In January 2018, Matej Palčič left for Wisła Kraków. On the last day of the winter transfer window, Marwan Kabha signed with Hapoel Be'er Sheva.

In

Out

Loans in

Loans out

Slovenian League

The 2017–18 season of the Slovenian PrvaLiga saw 10 teams play 36 matches; four against every other team, with two matches at each club's stadium. Three points were awarded for each win, one point per draw, and none for defeats. At the end of the season the top team qualified for the first qualifying round of the UEFA Champions League; teams in second and third qualified for the qualifying stages of the UEFA Europa League instead. The fixture list was released on 22 June 2017.

July–September

Maribor hosted Aluminij at Ljudski vrt on the opening weekend of the season. Aleks Pihler scored the only goal of the game early in the second half. In the second round, Maribor played against newly promoted Triglav Kranj. After 60 minutes, Triglav were leading 2–0; however, Maribor managed to turn the game around, scoring three goals in the last twenty minutes for a 3–2 victory. One week later, Maribor defeated Rudar Velenje 1–0 for the third consecutive league victory. Maribor ended July in second place with the same number of points (nine) as Olimpija Ljubljana. In the first week of August, Maribor defeated Ankaran Hrvatini 5–1 away from home, topping the league for the first time in the season. In the fifth round, Maribor failed to win a match for the first time in the season after a goalless draw against Domžale. A 95th-minute goal by Aleks Pihler secured three points against Krško in a 3–2 victory. Head coach Darko Milanič has made several changes to the starting lineup with a purpose to rest the players for the return leg of the Champions League play-offs against Hapoel Be'er-Sheva. The first derby of the season between "eternal rivals" Olimpija and Maribor, contested on 27 August 2017 at the Stožice Stadium in Ljubljana, has ended in a goalless draw.

After the international break in early September, Maribor contested in another goalless draw, this time against Celje at home. In the ninth round, a brace from Jasmin Mešanović secured three points against Gorica in a 3–0 victory. Maribor won another game with a score of 3–2 after a comeback in the last twenty minutes, this time against Aluminij; in this match, Lior Inbrum was sent-off on his debut appearance for the club. After two consecutive victories, Maribor contested in yet another goalless draw against Triglav at home.

October–December
In October, Maribor played three league games, against Ankaran Hrvatini at home and against Rudar Velenje and Domžale away, narrowly winning all three games, scoring four goals and conceding one. Three out of four team goals were scored by Mešanović. In the first week of November, Maribor secured their highest win of the season after defeating Krško 5–0, with a hat-trick scored by team captain Marcos Tavares and a brace by Aleksander Rajčević. In the second "Eternal derby" of the season on 17 November 2017, Maribor defeated Olimpija 1–0 at home in front of 9,000 spectators with another goal scored by Tavares, topping the league table for the first time since early August. However, in the next round, Maribor suffered their first defeat of the season, losing 2–1 in the "Styrian derby" against Celje. In this match, Tavares scored his 130th goal in the Slovenian top division, tying himself with Štefan Škaper as the all-time top goalscorer in the PrvaLiga. Tavares became the sole record holder when he scored a winning goal in the next round against Gorica in a 2–1 victory. In the last round of the autumn part of the season, Maribor should have played against Aluminij, but the match was postponed to February 2018 due to snowy conditions. Before the winter break, Maribor were top of the league with 43 points out of 18 games.

February–May
Maribor began the spring part of the season with a goalless draw at home against Aluminij on 25 February 2018. After the match against Triglav was postponed due to snow, Maribor contested in another home draw against Rudar and dropped to second place by early March, behind their rivals Olimpija. Maribor won their first match in the spring part of the season on 10 March after defeating Ankaran Hrvatini 3–0 with a goals by Dare Vršič, Luka Zahović, and Jasmin Mešanović, before suffering their first home defeat of the season in the next round against Domžale. This was followed by another home defeat, this time against Krško. After the match, during the press conference, Zlatko Zahovič, a Director of Football at Maribor, made a personal attack against the journalist of the sports newspaper EkipaSN, which caused a major controversy among the media and the public. As a result, Zahovič was suspended by the club and the Football Association of Slovenia. In the third "Eternal derby" of the season, Maribor and Olimpija drew 1–1 in Ljubljana as Olimpija retained a ten-point lead over Maribor after 25 matches. In the 26th round, Maribor ended their home ground winless drought after defeating Celje 3–2 with a hat-trick by Luka Zahović. At Stanko Mlakar Stadium, Maribor equalised their highest win of the season as they defeated Triglav 5–0 in a previously postponed match. In the next round, however, Maribor surpassed this record as they defeated Gorica 6–0 in Nova Gorica, extending their winning streak to three games, in which the team scored fourteen goals. In the two remaining games of April, Maribor defeated Aluminij and Triglav, reducing Olimpija's lead to only one point. Maribor began the last month of the season with another two victories, over Rudar and Ankaran, extending their winning streak to seven games, before drawing 1–1 with Domžale in the 32nd round after a 91st-minute equalizer by Tavares. In the next round, Maribor topped the league table for the first time since late February after defeating Krško 2–1 at Matija Gubec Stadium, while Olimpija dropped points against Ankaran. In the last derby of the season on 19 May, Maribor lost 3–2 to Olimpija after Andrés Vombergar's last-minute winner in front of 12,166 spectators, again dropping to second place. Maribor have won two remaining matches, 4–0 and 2–0 against Celje and Gorica, respectively, but lost the league title to Olimpija with the same number of points, but worse head-to-head record.

Matches

Colour key: Green = Maribor win; Yellow = draw; Red = opponents win.

Notes

Classification

Results summary

Results by round

Slovenian Cup

Maribor entered the competition in the Round of 16, receiving a bye as one of the four Slovenian teams that competed in the UEFA competitions during the season. Their opening match was a 3–0 away win against Tabor Sežana on 5 September 2017, with two goals scored by Jasmin Mešanović and one goal by Aleksander Rajčević. In the quarter-finals, Maribor was eliminated 4–1 on aggregate by their "Eternal rivals" Olimpija Ljubljana, failing to qualify for the semi-finals for the first time since the 2002–03 season.

Colour key: Green = Maribor win; Yellow = draw; Red = opponents win.

UEFA Champions League

The UEFA Champions League is a continental club football competition organised by UEFA. Founded in the 1950s as the European Champion Clubs' Cup, the competition was open to champion clubs of each country and arranged as a straight knockout tournament. The growth of television rights saw the format rebranded in the 1990s to include a group stage and permit multiple entrants. Maribor have qualified for the group stage in 1999–2000 and 2014–15, when they finished in fourth place in the group on both occasions.

Qualifying rounds

Maribor began the European campaign in the second qualifying round. They were drawn against Zrinjski Mostar, a team they have already met in the same stage of the competition during the 2014–15 season. In the first leg in Mostar, Maribor secured a 2–1 win with a goals by Luka Zahović and Marcos Tavares; Blaž Vrhovec was also sent off after receiving two yellow cards. In the second leg, Zrinjski took the lead early in the game, before Mitja Viler equalised for the final score of 1–1, thus Maribor eliminated Zrinjski 3–2 on aggregate. Maribor continued in the third qualifying round, where they defeated FH 2–0 on aggregate; Tavares scored both goals for Maribor. In the play-off round, Maribor eliminated Israeli side Hapoel Be'er Sheva. The first match in Israel has finished 2–1 for the home side, with Tavares scoring his four European goal of the season. In the return leg in Maribor, Viler scored the only goal of the match in a 1–0 victory, sending Maribor through to the group stage of the competition for the third time in the club's history due to away goals rule.

Second qualifying round

Colour key: Green = Maribor win; Yellow = draw; Red = opponents win.

Third qualifying round

Colour key: Green = Maribor win; Yellow = draw; Red = opponents win.

Play-off round

Colour key: Green = Maribor win; Yellow = draw; Red = opponents win.

Group stage

Maribor were drawn in Group E, along with Spartak Moscow, Sevilla, and Liverpool. The club opened their group stage campaign with a 1–1 home draw against Spartak. Damjan Bohar scored the equalising goal late in the game. In the second matchday, Maribor suffered a 3–0 defeat against Sevilla after a hat-trick by Ben Yedder. In the third round, Maribor suffered their biggest home defeat in European competitions as the team lost 7–0 to Liverpool. Liverpool repeated the feat in the home match at Anfield, defeating Maribor 3–0. Maribor secured their second point in the fifth round in Moscow, again drawing 1–1 with Spartak, with Jasmin Mešanović scoring a last-minute goal. Maribor concluded their European season with a home draw against Sevilla, finishing the competition in fourth place with three points out of six games.

Group E

Colour key: Green = Maribor win; Yellow = draw; Red = opponents win.

Friendlies

June–July
To prepare for the forthcoming season, Maribor played a series of friendlies across Eastern Slovenia. Their first match ended in defeat against Osijek of the Croatian First Football League; Valon Ahmedi scored the opening goal of the season for Maribor in the first half, before Osijek turned the game around in the second half for a 2–1 victory. Maribor then played out a 1–1 draw against Shkëndija, with both goals of the game scored in the first ten minutes. Maribor recorded their first victory of the pre-season against the Russian side Ural. The first goal was scored by newly-signed Jasmin Mešanović in the 62nd minute, while Gregor Bajde scored the second goal just one minute later for the final 2–0. During the next few days, Maribor narrowly won two more games, defeating Macedonian champions Vardar and Romanian team Dinamo București, 1–0 and 2–1 respectively. Maribor concluded their pre-season with two defeats, against Croatian first division side Inter Zaprešić and the Russian Premier League side Krasnodar. During the match against Inter, Mešanović and Ahmedi have picked up injuries and have been substituted in the first half.

Colour key: Green = Maribor win; Yellow = draw; Red = opponents win.

January–March
During the winter break, Maribor played several friendly matches at their home stadium, Ljudski vrt, and in Belek, Turkey.

Colour key: Green = Maribor win; Yellow = draw; Red = opponents win.

Squad statistics

Maribor used a total of 32 players during the 2017–18 season and there were 17 different goalscorers. Tavares featured in 47 matches – the most of any Maribor player in the campaign. The highest scorer was also Tavares, with 22 goals in all competitions, followed by Zahović who scored 19 goals. Zahović became the top goalscorer of the Slovenian PrvaLiga with 18 goals; all of them were scored in the second part of the season. Four Maribor players were sent off during the season: Vrhovec, Ivković, Handanović, and Inbrum.

Key

No. = Squad number

Pos = Playing position

Nat. = Nationality

Apps = Appearances

GK = Goalkeeper

DF = Defender

MF = Midfielder

FW = Forward

 = Yellow cards

 = Red cards

Source:

See also
List of NK Maribor seasons

References

NK Maribor seasons
Maribor
Maribor